This list of earthquakes in Azerbaijan, is a list of notable earthquakes that have affected areas within the current boundaries of Azerbaijan.

See also
Geology of Azerbaijan

References

Azerbaijan
 
Earthquakes
Earthquakes